Butleigh is a small village and civil parish, located in Somerset. The nearest village to it is Barton St David, and it is located a short distance from Glastonbury and Street. Its population is 823. Butleigh has a church, small village shop, a Church of England primary school and Butleigh Nursery School.

History

Butleigh was mentioned in the Domesday Book, belonging to Glastonbury Abbey. It had two separate entries, with the names Bodeslege and Boduchelei.

The parish of Butleigh was part of the Whitley Hundred.

Butleigh Court, which was abandoned for many years and has now been brought back into use, is noted for its interesting architecture including the tall carved chimney stacks, which are all different. Another interesting landmark is the cedar avenue, just outside the village. It was built in 1845 by J. C. Buckler, for Henry Neville-Grenville, on the site of an earlier building.

The village history is told in a slim book, Butleigh: One Thousand Years of an English Village, by E. F. Synge, a former vicar at the parish church. A reconstruction of life of one farm worker, John Hodges, who lived in the village during the Victorian era, is illustrated at the Somerset Rural Life Museum in Glastonbury.

There is the lofty column on the nearby Combe Hill of the Admiral Hood Monument raised to the memory of Sir Samuel Hood on a hill near Butleigh, and in Butleigh Church is another memorial, with an inscription written by Robert Southey.

There is also a 16th-century pub in Butleigh called The Rose and Portcullis.

Governance

The parish council has responsibility for local issues, including setting an annual precept (local rate) to cover the council’s operating costs and producing annual accounts for public scrutiny. The parish council evaluates local planning applications and works with the local police, district council officers, and neighbourhood watch groups on matters of crime, security, and traffic. The parish council's role also includes initiating projects for the maintenance and repair of parish facilities, as well as consulting with the district council on the maintenance, repair and improvement of highways, drainage, footpaths, public transport and street cleaning. Conservation matters (including trees and listed buildings) and environmental issues are also the responsibility of the council.

The village falls within the Non-metropolitan district of Mendip, which was formed on 1 April 1974 under the Local Government Act 1972. Mendip is responsible for local planning and building control, local roads, council housing, environmental health, markets and fairs, refuse collection and recycling, cemeteries and crematoria, leisure services, parks and tourism. (Before 1974, Butleigh was part of Wells Rural District.)

Somerset County Council is responsible for running the largest and most expensive local services such as education, social services, libraries, main roads, public transport, policing and  fire services, trading standards, waste disposal and strategic planning.

The village forms part of the 'Butleigh and Baltonsborough' Wards and electoral divisions of the United Kingdom. From Butleigh the ward goes east to Baltonsborough then south to Lydford-on-Fosse. The total population of the ward as at the 2011 census was 2,198.

It is also part of the Somerton and Frome county constituency represented in the House of Commons of the Parliament of the United Kingdom. It elects one Member of Parliament (MP) by the first past the post system of election, and was part of the South West England constituency of the European Parliament prior to Britain leaving the European Union in January 2020, which elected seven MEPs using the d'Hondt method of party-list proportional representation.

Religious sites

The Church of St Leonard dates from the 14th century, and was restored and extended in the middle of the 19th century by J. C. Buckler. It has been designated by English Heritage as a grade II* listed building.

Notable people
William Robert Cornish (1828–1896) was a British physician who served in India for more than thirty years and became the Surgeon-General—head of medical services—in the Madras Presidency.
1st Viscount Admiral Hood

References

External links

Butleigh family History

Villages in Mendip District
Civil parishes in Somerset